Judie Tzuke (born Judie Myers, 3 April 1956) is an English singer-songwriter. She is best known for her 1979 hit "Stay with Me till Dawn", which reached number 16 on the UK Singles Chart.

Life and career

Early life
Tzuke's family relocated from Poland to England in the 1920s, and changed their surname from Tzuke to Myers, like other Jewish families from Eastern Europe. Her mother, Jean Silverside, was a television actress, and her father, Sefton Myers, was a successful property developer who also managed artists and singers—most notably Andrew Lloyd Webber and Tim Rice during the writing of Jesus Christ Superstar.  Tzuke preferred the original family name, started using it at school and so, when Tzuke embarked on her singing career, she used it as her stage name.

Educated in the visual arts, performing arts, and music, Tzuke performed in folk clubs from the age of 15. Her meeting with Mike Paxman in 1975 was a turning point and they began to collaborate. Under the name Tzuke & Paxo, they eventually secured a recording contract and the duo released a single, "These are the Laws", produced by Tony Visconti.

Early success
Tzuke's career as a solo artist began in 1977, when she signed to Elton John's label The Rocket Record Company. Her first single on Rocket, "For You", was released in 1978. Her only notable success, "Stay with Me till Dawn", was released in 1979. The song, which was co-written with Mike Paxman, became a top 20 hit on the UK Singles Chart in the summer of 1979 and a top 10 hit in Australia and was featured on Tzuke's 1979 debut album, Welcome to the Cruise, which was also a top 20 hit on the UK Albums Chart. In 2002, "Stay with Me till Dawn" was chosen by the British public in a poll of the 50 Best British Songs 1952–2002 (ranking at number 39). The song was also sampled by Mylo in the song "Need You Tonite", from his 2004 album Destroy Rock & Roll.

Tzuke's second album, Sports Car (1980), charted higher than her debut album (reaching No. 7 in the UK) and contained one single, "Living on the Coast", which failed to chart. Both albums were certified gold by the British Phonographic Industry in 1981. Tzuke became Elton John's support act for his North American tour, and she was the opening act in front of 400,000 people who turned out to watch his free concert at New York's Central Park on September 13, 1980.  She went on to release one more album on Rocket, I Am the Phoenix (1981), which also made the UK top 20.

1982-1995

In 1982, Tzuke signed to Chrysalis Records and released her fourth album, Shoot the Moon. Although the album reached the UK top 20, it was Tzuke's last album to do so. Three singles were taken from the album (including a 7" picture disc release for "I'm Not a Loser"), but none were chart hits. Tzuke completed a 57 date tour of the UK, culminating as the headline act at that year's Glastonbury Festival. The performance was recorded for a TV special by ITV. Several performances from the tour were recorded and released at the end of 1982 as a double album, Road Noise: The Official Bootleg.

In 1983, Rocket issued a compilation album, The Best of Judie Tzuke, and released the track "Black Furs" as a single (the original version of which was on Tzuke's 1981 album I Am the Phoenix). September 1983 saw the release of Tzuke's fifth studio album, Ritmo (Spanish for "rhythm"). The album was somewhat of a departure from her previous work, with a much more electronic feel. The single "Jeannie No" preceded the album and had radio airplay, but did not chart. An edit and extended remix of the track were issued on 7" and 12" single formats (Tzuke's first). The subsequent single "How Do I Feel?" did not fare any better, and the album itself peaked at No. 26 in the UK. Neither the album nor singles were released internationally.

During autumn 1983, Tzuke toured a series of larger (but fewer) venues. After two albums, Tzuke left Chrysalis Records. Wanting to take greater control of her work, she signed with the small independent Legacy Records for the release of her next album. A new single, "You", was released in October 1984. A cover of a lesser-known Marvin Gaye track, her version turned a rather sedate piece into a grinding electro production. It peaked at No. 92 in the UK, and several different versions of the track were released on 7" and 12" formats. In March 1985, "I'll Be the One" was issued as a new single from Tzuke's forthcoming sixth album, The Cat Is Out, which was mainly recorded at her home studio and released in June 1985. The single peaked at No. 97, while the album peaked at No. 35 on the UK Albums Chart. A third single, "Love Like Fire", was released shortly afterwards, again with several versions on 7" and 12" formats, though this failed to chart. September 1985 saw a fourth single from the album, "This Side of Heaven", which coincided with Tzuke's national concert tour, although this too failed to chart. The show at Fairfield Halls in Croydon was recorded for a television special which, several years later, was issued as a CD/DVD release.

Following the muted reception of The Cat Is Out, Tzuke signed with another major label, Polydor Records, in 1987. She began working on her seventh album, though took some time off in June 1987 when she gave birth to her first daughter, Bailey. However, the release of the album was delayed further after Polydor first requested that Tzuke work with a producer of their choice rather than with her usual team. Polydor later agreed to allow Tzuke to re-record the entire album with her own team of Paul Muggleton (her husband) and Mike Paxman. The album, Turning Stones, was released in April 1989, peaking at No. 57 on the UK Albums Chart. It was preceded by the single "We'll Go Dreaming", which had peaked at No. 96 several weeks earlier. Further problems arose between Tzuke and Polydor which led to the last minute cancellation of her 1989 tour, enraging fans who had turned up to venues. She apologised to fans, and when she appeared as a guest on Radio 1's Friday evening record review show Round Table.

In 1990, she switched to Columbia Records (CBS). In August, she released a new single, a cover version of the Beach Boys classic "God Only Knows". Despite the single being issued in various formats (7", 7" poster wrap, limited edition numbered 10", 12", cassette-single and CD-single) and a video being made, the song failed to gain chart success. A limited promo 12" was issued of a remix made by DJ Judge Jules. The song also featured in an ITV documentary series about recording techniques, where Tzuke and her producers Mike Paxman and Paul Muggleton showed how the song had been constructed using samples of her voice which were transposed into a synthesizer range. Her eighth album, Left Hand Talking, was released by Columbia in May 1991.

Promotion for the album had begun in March when a three-track promo had been issued widely to independent record stores, and Tzuke made two live performances at London's Shaw Theatre in April. These performances were the first time neither Muggleton, Paxman or Bob Noble were part of her live band. "Outlaws" was released as a single by Columbia in June 1991, but neither the album nor single made an impact upon the charts despite Radio 1 DJ Richard Skinner making "Outlaws" his record of the week on his Saturday afternoon show. Her tenure with Columbia ended after only one album.

Tzuke signed with another small independent label for the release of her ninth album, Wonderland, which was released in September 1992 by Essential Records (a subsidiary of the now-defunct Castle Communications). Two singles from the album, "Wonderland" and "Fly", were performed on the BBC1 lunchtime programme Pebble Mill at One in November 1992, after Tzuke had performed a concert tour of smaller venues in October and November. Neither the album nor singles charted, despite featuring the talents of Brian May from Queen and Nigel Kennedy on violin. She stated in a later interview (used in the inner booklet of the 2002 reissue of the album) that Wonderland was the album she felt most proud of as a songwriter. August 1995 saw the release of two albums. The BBC issued its recording of Tzuke's "Radio 1 in Concert" performance from 1981, and Polygram issued a compilation album entitled Stay with Me till Dawn which drew on Tzuke's first three albums released on Rocket Records with tracks from the Turning Stones album on Polydor Records. The album included four single remixes which had not previously been available on CD.

1996-present

Tzuke released her tenth studio album, Under the Angels, in October 1996 on her own label, Big Moon Records. The album was previewed by two dates at London's Jazz Café, in August 1996 and in Dublin in October that year. Three tours to promote the album, playing at over 30 venues, took place in January/February, June and November 1997. Recordings from the tour culminated in another live album, Over the Moon (1997).

In 1998, Tzuke released her eleventh studio album, Secret Agent, again on her own label, Big Moon. Bob Harris of BBC Radio 2 included one of the album's tracks, "Tonight", on his compilation CD Bob Harris Presents... (Vol.1). In 2000, Tzuke gained the rights to her first three albums recorded for Rocket Records and reissued them on CD via Big Moon. She named her tour later that year the "Phoenix Tour", a reference to her last Rocket Records album, I Am the Phoenix. Following this came a new live album, Six Days Before the Flood (2000), and a new studio album, Queen Secret Keeper (2001). Another live album, Drive Live, was released in 2002.

Tzuke then released an album of covers, The Beauty of Hindsight, in September 2003. A self-promoted tour in September ended with two nights at London's Bush Hall. Two dates in March 2004 were played at London's Cabot Hall in Canary Wharf as part of the Docklands Music Festival and the following night at Dartford's Mick Jagger Centre, previewing two new tracks—"Addiction" (never released but later part of the B.E.D.'s Ver. 1.0 and Ver. 1.5 albums with Tzuke on backing vocals) and "Before I Found My Heart".

In 2004, Tzuke release her thirteenth album, The End of the Beginning, which saw her returning to a much heavier rock style on many of the tracks and the use of strings for the first time since 1981. Most of the album was played as part of her tour in October of that year. 2002 Pop Idol runner-up Gareth Gates joined Tzuke on stage to sing backing vocals on the track "Bully". The pair were first introduced by Lucie Silvas who had previously been one of Tzuke's backing singers and had also written material for Gates. Silvas and Tzuke also co-wrote most of the songs for Silvas' platinum-selling 2004 album Breathe In and co-wrote four tracks for Silvas' 2006 album The Same Side. Tzuke also provided backing vocals.

In January 2006 one of Tzuke's co-writes, "Strange Love", hit the UK top twenty for the group Phixx. Later in 2006, Tzuke provided vocals for the song "Falling Down" for the group Hybrid on their album I Choose Noise. In 2007 two other Tzuke co-writes featured on the eponymous album by the Canadian brothers RyanDan. "Like The Sun" and "High" were both released as singles and the album reached number 7 in the UK album charts. In 2007, Tzuke released her fifteenth album, Songs 1. It was accompanied by her biggest tour in almost a decade, with her daughter Bailey Tzuke on backing vocals, and collaborations with other musicians such as Gareth Gates on piano (who also co-wrote the album's track "Dark Days" with Tzuke). March 2007 saw the download single release of "Cup of Tea Song" from the album. She also collaborated with David P. Goodes and co-wrote the song "What's It All For" for Laura Michelle Kelly.

June 2008 saw the release of Tzuke's sixteenth studio album, Songs 2. The same year, she co-wrote four tracks with the band Morcheeba, and featured as a vocalist on two tracks from their Dive Deep album, including the lead single "Enjoy the Ride". In October 2008, Tzuke reached no. 37 in the US Adult Contemporary chart when she provided vocals for the American jazz combo Project Grand Slam on their self-titled album. The track, "Captain Of The Heart", was not officially released as a single, but charted through airplay. The album was produced by Grammy-winning producer Frank Filipetti and was nominated for eight Grammy awards. Hot on the heels of this there was an official US release (via CD Baby only) and international download release of the single "Christmas And I'm Home", which Tzuke had written with Gareth Gates in 2004 (Gates had already released his own version of the song). Tzuke recorded versions of the song with Haim Cotton, the pianist with Project Grand Slam. Proceeds from sales went to the New York Ronald McDonald's charity.

On 18 July 2009, Tzuke took part in a Teenage Cancer benefit concert at Kilworth House, Leicestershire, alongside Lucie Silvas. She performed three tracks solo ("Love Me No More", "Stay With Me Till Dawn" and "If (When You Go)") accompanied by a string quartet. She returned to the stage for an encore performance alongside Silvas, singing their co-written "Place To Hide" as a duet.

In 2010, Tzuke released a thirty-year celebratory double-album titled Moon On a Mirrorball, via a new deal with Wrasse Records. The collection featured over thirty songs from her back catalogue, some re-recorded songs and some new songs, one of which, "If (When You Go)", was released as a single in April 2010, and the song "Love You No More" was made available as a 1-track promo single. Wrasse also re-released all of Tzuke's Big Moon back catalogue as downloads, and reissued her debut album Welcome To The Cruise on CD. A live album, October Road, was recorded from the tour and was released in March 2011 via Tzuke's official website. In 2011, she contributed to John Martyn's tribute album, Johnny Boy Would Have Loved This, with a recording of Martyn's "Hurt in Your Heart".

December 2011 say the release of the album One Tree Less by Big Moon and a subsequent national release by Wrasse in March 2012. "Humankind" was issued as a promo single and was played several times on the Radio 2 shows of Graham Norton, Bob Harris, Lisa Tarbuck and Claudia Winkleman, helping the album to feature in the top 10 of Itune's Singer Songwriter chart. A national tour in 2012 was made promote the album alongside many interviews for BBC and regional independent radio stations.

In 2013 a new initiative, "Song Club", was started  with fans able to purchase a monthly download and/or CD issue of 13 tracks. Songs on the album where an array of tracks written for other artists, demos and new recordings. Buyers were also treated to an additional downloadable four tracks which included three instrumentals from the album and an alternative recording of "If (When You Go)". The CD issue of the album was issued in December 2013.

Tzuke announced in early 2013 that work had commenced on a new album entitled Woman Overboard. Due to Tzuke being diagnosed with cancer, work on the album was halted.

Due to the popularity and positive feedback of Song Club and obvious delays with the Woman Overboard album, Tzuke decided to issue Song Club 2, starting in May 2014. Again the album was released with monthly downloads and a CD issue in May 2015, again with purchasers treated to several bonus tracks. Song Club 2 had a more rockier and dance orientated feel than its predecessor.

May and June 2014 saw Tzuke on another UK tour, entitled "Woman Overboard". Further health issues, this time with her voice, meant that several dates were rescheduled. Throughout the tour Tzuke had battled with laryngitis and was reluctant to disappoint fans, as ticket sales had been extremely successful. Often battling with nerves, during one sold-out performance at London's Union Chapel, mid performance, her voice gave way - but with the help of her daughters, sharing lead duties, and fans in the audience, she completed a slightly truncated performance. She received three standing ovations that night. She later confirmed that it was this performance that acted as the catalyst for her beating her crippling stage fright.

Starting in late 2014, Tzuke commenced on a new approach to touring called "Songs and Stories". She chose to play significantly smaller venues, with 54 dates during 2015 and over 40 in 2016 across the country. Most dates were sold out and Twitter and Facebook comments reflected hundreds of people "re-finding" her music again. The format of the "Songs and Stories" dates were to sing a cross-range of old and new songs spanning her career interspersed with anecdotes relating the songs and inviting people in the audience to ask questions. These performances saw Tzuke accompanied by one or both of her daughters on backing vocals, Graham Kearns and/or Chaz Thorogood on guitar and on occasions other friends and musicians accompanying her.

From 2016, Tzuke continued playing acoustic dates across the country under "Peace has Broken Out", introducing her audience to many new tracks from her forthcoming album.

Tzuke started a crowd-funding issue of her next album, Peace Has Broken Out (renamed from Woman Overboard) which was pre-released to crowd funders on 25 June with a download of 13 tracks, with a physical release issued in August. The official release of the album was made on 1 September, with a national release and download planned for the following month. She treated fans who had crowd funded the album to several additional tracks, including early mixes of songs from the album, a bonus track and three live versions of songs from the "Songs and Stories" tour.

In 2018, Tzuke joined with Beverley Craven and Julia Fordham to record "Safe", a song that she had written with Beth Nielsen Chapman, whilst on a Chris Difford songwriting retreat. Following the success of the single, which was well received, an album was released titled Woman to Woman, together with a tour of the same name in late 2018 with 20 of 22 dates sold out. Several dates at larger venues included orchestras. The planned April 2019 second leg of the tour was postponed due to chemotherapy treatment Beverley Craven undertook following a double mastectomy. The tour was rescheduled for June 2019.

The single "Safe" went to number 1 in the UK iTunes Singer Songwriter charts and also went top 10 in the Amazon singles chart in March 2018. Appearances were made on ITV's This Morning, ITV London Evening News and London Live News. An hour long concert was also recorded and broadcast in November 2018 for BBC Radio Scotland.

A lavish 24 CD box, entitled Full Moon was issued in November 2018 which included all her 23 studio and live albums plus a bonus disc of rare material only made available via her website comprising tracks from her two Song Club albums.

Due to the rescheduling of the second leg of the Woman To Woman tour, plans for the 40th anniversary of Welcome To the Cruise and planned tour have been postponed until early 2020. Tzuke has begun working in 2019 on a new album with the working title of The Wolf Moon Sessions.

On 26 September 2021 Judie appeared in a War Child Fundraiser entitled 'Dear John' at London's Under The Bridge Venue, featuring songs written by John Lennon, singing 'Love'. The concert was recorded and streamed the following month to raise additional funds. 

Judie appeared as one of 4 artists, alongside Jamie Lawson at Cardigan Hall, to raise funds for a songwriter's charity organised by DJ Bob Harris. She performed 5 songs and took part in a collective performance of 'Wicked Game' for the finale of the concert.

A special limited edition of the Woman To Woman album was reissued on 15 October 2022, with new artwork using illustrations created by Judie. The release also included a bonus live version of Safe. The release was issued on picture disc, CD and as a download.

Two performances took place at Wavendon Stables on 13 and 14 November 2021 with Beverley Craven, with a string quartet. The show was further reprised on 3 December at Litchfield Cathedral. 

On 21 November 2021, two songs were released as an EP and individually by Woman To Woman - 'Thank You For Being and Friend'(a cover of the Andrew Gold song) and Juniper Tree (a new song written by Julia Fordham). The single also featured special guest Rumer. The single release was promoted with an internet interview on the Michael Ball show on BBC Radio 2 and a pre recorded interview and live performance of 'Safe' on the Hayley Palmer Saturday evening show on Sky Arts. Judie and Beverley (together and independently) also undertook several BBC regional radio phone interviews to promote the release, as did Julia.

An 18 date Woman To Woman Tour for October/November 2022 was announced in December 2021, which would also feature special guest Rumer. 

Judie also took part in the Great British Folk festival at Skegness on 26th November. An acoustic date was played at the Crooked Billet in Stoke Row on December 8 2021.

On 28th January 2022 the Woman To Woman Live In Concert album was released on download, double CD and triple LP versions. It charted at number 35 in the mid week sales chart for the first week of February. The album was recorded on the second W2W tour from June 2019. 

"Rest of My Life (The Wedding Song)' a Craven/Tzuke composition featuring Craven/Tzuke/Fordham/Rumer was released on 27 May 2022. The track went to number 14 in the Polish International Artist's chart in July 2022.

Craven and Tzuke took part in the Petworth Festival on 28th July 2022, performing at Midhurst Rother's College, again with the GabrielSwallow String Quartet. 

A re-recording of Tzuke's track "Humankind' from her "One Tree Less' album from 2011 was released on 5 August 2022 with Beverley Craven and Julia Fordham. A promotional video was also released.The single spent 3 months (August to October 2020) in the Top 10 chart of Dutch online radio station chart for 'Oscar's Tip Top Tien', reaching number 2 on 3 September 2020.

Discography

References

External links
Official website
Myspace site

1956 births
Living people
English women singer-songwriters
British soft rock musicians
English people of Polish descent
Singers from London
Capitol Records artists
Chrysalis Records artists
Columbia Records artists
Polydor Records artists
Rocket Records artists